Pisces Aviation (dba as PassionAir) is a domestic airline of Ghana with its head office in Accra, Ghana, and its main hub at Kotoka International Airport in Accra. 

It is the second largest airline in Ghana, having transported 213,022 passengers in 2019,  and holds a 35% share of the domestic market as of 2022.

History 

Passion Air was founded as DAC International Airlines (Ghana) by notable local businessman Edward Annan, in partnership with DAC Aviation of Kenya. The company was founded in 2017 and achieved its Air Operator Certificate in December that year. Flight operations commenced under the PassionAir brand in August 2018 using a single Bombardier Dash 8 Q400.

On 20 February 2021, Passion Air operated its first flight with an all female crew from Accra to Tamale. The airline is also notable for hiring Ghana's youngest female pilot, Audrey Esi Swatson.

Fleet 

The PassionAir fleet consists of the following aircraft (as of April 2022):

Destinations
PassionAir operates the following scheduled services as of March 2022.
Ghana
 Accra – Kotoka International Airport
 Kumasi – Kumasi Airport
 Tamale - Tamale Airport
 Takoradi – Takoradi Airport
 Wa - Wa Airport
 Sunyani – Sunyani Airport

Incidents

 On 10 October 2018, a PassionAir Bombardier Dash 8 from Kumasi to Accra experienced a taxiway excursion incident upon arrival. No injuries were reported, but the aircraft was grounded for further investigation.

References 

Airlines of Ghana
Airlines established in 2017
Ghanaian companies established in 2017